Justice Crockett may refer to:

J. Allen Crockett, associate justice of the Utah Supreme Court
Joseph B. Crockett, associate justice of the Supreme Court of California